Barra de Valizas, also known as simply Valizas is a resort (balneario) in the Rocha Department of southeastern Uruguay.

Geography

In December 2014, Valizas was the site of the murder of Lola Chomnalez, which gained nationwide notoriety.

Population
In 2011 Barra de Valizas had a population of 330 permanent inhabitants and 995 dwellings.
 
Source: Instituto Nacional de Estadística de Uruguay

References

External links
 Information for Valizas Uruguay
INE map of Barra de Valizas
Tourist information for Valizas

Populated places in the Rocha Department
Seaside resorts in Uruguay